Manuchehr Eliasi or Manouchehr Eliasi is a former member of the Iranian Parliament
who was succeeded by Maurice Motamed in 2000.

See also
Persian Jews
Reserved Majlis seats

References

Jewish Representatives in Islamic Consultative Assembly
Living people
Iranian Jews
Jewish Iranian politicians
Members of the 5th Islamic Consultative Assembly
Year of birth missing (living people)